Dangi, Iran is a village in Kermanshah Province, Iran.

Dangi or Dengi in Iran may also refer to:
 Dangi-ye Abbas
 Dangi-ye Ali Beyg
 Dangi-ye Kak Abdollah